Garbas  is a village in the administrative district of Gmina Filipów, within Suwałki County, Podlaskie Voivodeship, in north-eastern Poland.

The village has a population of 865.

References

Garbas